The Israeli Chess Championship is a chess event held every year in Israel.

History
From 1951 to 1971, the men's and women's championships were held every two years, eventually becoming an annual event. The 1998 Championship was held 8–24 November in Ramat Aviv.
The single-elimination tournament, 32 players in the men's section and 16 in the women's, used an unusual time control of 100 minutes for 30 moves + 30 seconds per move. GM Eran Liss won the men's final over GM Victor Mikhalevski. After tying their 2-game match with one victory apiece, they then tied an active chess playoff with one win and two draws each.  In a 5-minute blitz playoff, Liss won 2–0. Irina Yudasina won the women's final over Ella Pitem with one win and one draw.

Winners

| valign="top" |
{| class="sortable wikitable"
! # !! Year !! Junior Champion
|-
| 1 || 1951 || Raaphi Persitz
|-
| 2 || 1954 || 	Giora Peli
|-
| 3 || 1958 || Yedael Stepak
|-
| 4 || 1959 || Yehuda Oppenheim
|-
| 5 || 1960 || Israel Gat
|-
| 6 || 1961 || Daniel Mor
|-
| 7 || 1962 || Israel Gelfer
|-
| 8 || 1963 || Yaacov Bleiman
|-
| 9 || 1964 || Yaacov Bleiman
|-
| 10 || 1965 || Amikam Balshan
|-
| 11 || 1966 || Abraham Neyman 
|-
| 12 || 1967 || Nathan Birnboim
|-
| 13 || 1968 || Nathan Birnboim
On Neyman
|-
| 14 || 1969 || Yoel Temanlis
|-
| 15 || 1970 || Arie Lev 
|-
| 16 || 1971 || Chagai Scheinwald
|-
| 17 || 1972 || Chagai Scheinwald
|-
| 18 || 1973 || David Bernstein
|-
| 19 || 1974 || Yehuda Gruenfeld 
|-
| 20 || 1975 || Nir Greenberg
|-
| 21|| 1976 || Ehud Lahav
|-
| 22|| 1977 || Michael Pasman
|-
| 23 || 1978 || Alon Greenfeld 
|-
| 24|| 1979 || Alon Greenfeld
|-
| 25|| 1980 || Dan Lapan
|-
| 26 || 1981 || Ran Shabtai
|-
| 27|| 1982 || Moshe Pyernik
|-
| 28 || 1983 || Ofer Brook
|-
| 29|| 1984 || Ronen Lev
|-
| 30|| 1985 || Ilan Manor
|-
| 31 || 1986 || Danny Barash
|-
| 32|| 1987 || Ronen Lev
|-
| 33|| 1988 || Ilan Manor
|-
| 34|| 1989 || Eran Liss
|-
| 35|| 1990 || Dan Zoler
|-
| 36 || 1991 || Victor Mikhalevski
|-
| 37|| 1992 || Victor Mikhalevski
|-
| 38|| 1993 || Eran Liss
|-
| 39|| 1994 || Michael Oratovsky
|-
| 40|| 1995 || Alik Vydeslaver
|-
| 41 || 1996 || Boris Avrukh 
|-
| 42|| 1997 || Dimitri Tyomkin
|-
| 43|| 1998 || Alexander Rabinovich
|-
| 44|| 1999 || Michael Roiz
|-
| 45|| 2000|| Alik Gershon
|-
| 46 || 2001|| Evgeny Postny
|-
| 47|| 2002|| Sergey Erenburg
|-
| 48|| 2003|| Sergey Erenburg
|-
| 49|| 2004|| Baruch Sternberg
|-
| 50|| 2005|| Gaby Livshits
|-
| 51|| 2006|| Maxim Rodshtein
|-
|52
|2007
|Sasha Kaplan
|-
| 53|| 2008||Gil Popilsky
|-
|54
|2012
|Asaf Givon
|-
|55
|2014
|Asaf Givon
|-
|56
|2015
|Nimrod Veinberg
|-
|57
|2017
|Avital Borochovsky
|-
|58
|2018
|Johnatan Bakalchuk
|-
|59
|2019
|Yair Parkhov
|-
|60
|2020
|Erez Kupervaser
|}
|}

See also
Ma'alot Tarshiha
Beersheba

References

Bibliography
 (results through 1982)

Chess national championships
Women's chess national championships
Chess in Israel
Chess